James Auckland and Travis Rettenmaier were the defending champions but they chose not to compete.
Daniele Bracciali and David Marrero beat Martin Fischer and Frederik Nielsen in the final (6–3, 6–3).

Seeds

Draw

Draw

References
 Main Draw

Mitsubishi Electric Europe Cup - Doubles
Internazionali di Monza E Brianza